Grand Siècle or Great Century refers to the period of French history during the 17th century, under the reigns of Louis XIII and Louis XIV.

The period was notable for its development of art and literature, along with the construction of the Palace of Versailles, the effects of the French Wars of Religion, and the impacts of the Thirty Years' War. Significant figures during this period include gardener André Le Nôtre, architect François Mansart, painter Nicolas Poussin, painter Philippe de Champaigne, painter Charles Le Brun, playwright Molière, poet Jean de La Fontaine, playwright Jean Racine, playwright Pierre Corneille, writer Charles Perrault, composers Henri Dumont, Jean-Baptiste Lully, Marc-Antoine Charpentier, Michel Richard Delalande, André Campra, Henri Desmarest, Marin Marais and François Couperin, philosophers Rene Descartes, Blaise Pascal, Antoine Arnauld and the Port-Royal, Nicolas Malebranche, Pierre Gassendi, La Rochefoucauld, La Bruyere, and Pierre Bayle.

See also 
 17th-century French literature
 17th-century French art

References 

17th century in France

Historiography
Louis XIV
Louis XIII
French Wars of Religion
Periodization